Nordic Business Forum (NBF) is a Finnish company, based in Jyväskylä. The company is best known for its eponymous business and leadership conference in Helsinki.

Nordic Business Forum is part of Nordic Business Group, which employs 31 people across Finland, Sweden, Norway, and Estonia. The current managing director is Priit Liiv. Nordic Business Forum is also a part of Business Forum Group which oversees the activities of Nordic Business Forum, Oslo Business Forum, and Amsterdam Business Forum.

The annual main event, Nordic Business Forum, gathers together over 7500 attendees from over 40 countries, 17.4% of the attendees being CEOs.

Organisation and history 
Nordic Business Forum is a subsidiary of the Nordic Business Group, which was founded in 2008 by Hans-Peter Siefen and Jyri Lindén. It was originally known as the Finnish Community of Entrepreneurship before changing its name in 2011.

The first Nordic Business Forum conference was held in October 2010. The following year, the first high-profile international speakers—former US Vice President Al Gore and motivational speaker Les Brown—were added to the lineup.

In 2013, Nordic Business Forum added a professional board of directors and held its first event outside of Finland—Sales Master Day in Tallinn, Estonia—featuring sales guru Brian Tracy.

The first Nordic Business Forum Sweden event was held in Stockholm in 2017, with a Nordic Business Forum Norway event being added in Oslo the following year.

In 2016, Nordic Business Group reported revenue of €15 million, with Nordic Business Forum generating €6.13m of the total.

Nordic Business Forum reported revenues of €7.39 million in 2017.

In March 2018, Finnish marketing executive Aslak de Silva took over as CEO of Nordic Business Forum from co-founder Hans-Peter Siefen, who remains active with the company as the chairman of the board.

In February 2022, Aslak de Silva left the company, and Nordic Business Forum partner and long time employer, Priit Liiv, stepped in as the interim managing director.

Awards and recognitions 

 Central Finland Marketing Deed Award 2011
 ICT Product of the Year 2014
 Evento Company Event of the Year 2016
 National Entrepreneur Award by the Federation of Finnish Enterprises in 2018

Event descriptions

Nordic Business Forum 
The company’s signature event is the Nordic Business Forum held annually in Helsinki, Finland since 2010. The 2018 event attracted more than 7,500 visitors and featured former US President Barack Obama as the main keynote speaker.

Nordic Business Forum Sweden 
Held in Stockholm since 2016, Nordic Business Forum Sweden mirrors the format of the Helsinki event but is smaller in scale. In 2018, the one-day event attracted around 1,000 attendees from 19 different countries.

Nordic Business Forum Norway 
Held for the first time in 2018, the Nordic Business Forum Norway takes place in Oslo and largely replicates the event held in Stockholm. The inaugural event attracted nearly 550 attendees.

Speaker Contest 
Ahead of the 2018 Nordic Business Forum in Helsinki, the organization launched its first Speaker Contest. More than 170 people applied, from which 24 candidates were chosen to speak at qualifying rounds held in Helsinki, Oslo, and Stockholm.

Eight finalists were then invited back to Stockholm in August 2018, from which one speaker was chosen by a jury of audience members and Nordic Business Forum representatives. The winner, James Hewitt, was added to Nordic Business Forum 2018 speaker lineup and received a €30,000 speaking fee for the engagement.

Event archive

Nordic Business Forum 2011: Strength from Responsible Choices

Nordic Business Forum 2011 concentrated on responsibility. The main topic was Strength from Responsible Choices and all the 1800 seats were sold out. The main speaker was the former Vice President of U.S. Al Gore.

Nordic Business Forum 2012: Growth

 In 2012 the main theme of Nordic Business Forum was growth, with sub-themes business growth, personal growth and growth of well-being.

The speakers included:
Sir Richard Branson
Brian Tracy
Daniel Pink
Hans Rosling
Peter Vesterbacka
Taneli Tikka
Jari Sarasvuo
Anne Berner
Esa Saarinen

Nordic Business Forum 2013: Leadership

Nordic Business Forum 2013 gathered over 3,300 guests under one roof. The seminar was sold out already by the end of February 2012, 7 months prior to the actual event date.

The main theme of Nordic Business Forum 2013 was Leadership. Sub-topics included self-leadership, sales leadership and innovation leadership.

The speakers included:
Jack Welch
Tom Peters
Jimmy Wales 
Malcolm Gladwell
Lynda Gratton
Vijay Govindarajan
Alexander Stubb
Alf Rehn
Jari Sarasvuo
Petri Parvinen
Henkka Hyppönen

Nordic Business Forum 2014: Forward

Nordic Business Forum 2014 gathered over 5,300 guests to the Exhibition & Convention Center in Helsinki. This was the first time the seminar was organized in Helsinki. The seminar was sold out already 4 months prior to the event. In addition to the attendees on the spot, there were also hundreds of people watching the seminar through live stream.

The main theme of Nordic Business Forum 2014 was Forward. Sub-topics included Choosing Excellence, Building the Future and Growing with Purpose.

The speakers included:
James C. Collins
Arnold Schwarzenegger
Sir Alex Ferguson
Dambisa Moyo 
Sir Ken Robinson
Matti Alahuhta
Tony Fernandes
Soulaima Gourani

Nordic Business Forum 2015: Impact

The Nordic Business Forum 2015 is held 1–2 October, in the Helsinki Exhibition and Convention Center, in Finland.

The speakers include:
Ben Bernanke
Arianna Huffington
Simon Sinek
Guy Kawasaki 
Keith J. Cunningham
Garry Kasparov
Nilofer Merchant
John C. Maxwell

Nordic Business Forum 2016: Advantage 
Nordic Business Forum 2016 was held on 6 and 7 October and focused on the theme advantage. In addition to the 5,700 conference attendees, around 10,000 people watched the event via the live stream broadcast.

Speakers included:

 Ed Catmull
 Amy Chua
 Dick Costolo
 Peter Diamandis
 Scott Galloway
 Seth Godin
 Tony Hawk
 Jessica Jackley
 Vinad Nayar
 Des Traynor
 Gary Vaynerchuk

Nordic Business Forum Sweden 2017 – The Future of Leading People and Growth 
The first Nordic Business Forum Sweden took place on 16 January at the Stockholm Waterfront Conference Centre. The event attracted nearly 1,000 attendees from 19 countries.

Speakers included:

 Linda Liukas
 Kjell A. Nordström
 Sheila Heen
 Chip Conley
 Ida Backlund
 Chad Hurley
 Andre Agassi

Nordic Business Forum 2017 – Responsibility, Purpose, and Leadership 
Nordic Business Forum 2017 was attended by 7,500 guests from more than 40 countries. In addition, the live stream broadcast was viewed by 15,000 people.

Speakers included:

 Will Smith
 Sir Richard Branson
 Adam Grant
 Rachel Botsman
 Patrick Lencioni
 James Hansen
 Severn Cullis-Suzuki
 Nick Vujicic
 Stéphane Garelli
 Petteri Taalas
 Mika Anttonen
 Boyan Slat
 Selina Juul
 Richard Quest

Nordic Business Forum Norway 2018 – Lead Lean 
The first Nordic Business Forum Norway took place on 22 January in Oslo. The event attracted nearly 550 attendees.

Speakers included:

 Eric Ries
 Seth Godin
 Alex Osterwalder
 Dan Toma
 Anita Krohn Traaseth
 Hans-Petter Nygård Hansen
 Sabinije von Gaffke
 Alf Rehn

Nordic Business Forum Sweden 2018 – Lead Lean 
Nordic Business Forum Sweden 2018 took place on 24 January in Stockholm. The event attracted nearly 1,000 attendees from 19 countries.

Speakers included:

 Eric Ries
 Steve Wozniak
 Seth Godin
 Anita Krohn Traaseth
 Lena Apler
 Cheri Tree

Nordic Business Forum 2018 – Strategy, Peak Performance and Artificial Intelligence 
Nordic Business Forum 2018 was held at the Helsinki Expo & Convention Center on 26 and 27 September, attracting 7,500 attendees from more than 40 countries. The live stream was viewed by approximately 20,000 people, with an additional 20,000 watching a free broadcast of President Barack Obama’s conversation with Niklas Zennström.

Speakers included:

 President Barack Obama
 Marcus Buckingham
 Steven Kotler
 Andrew McAfee
 Don Tapscott
 Susan Cain
 Gary Hamel
 Aswath Damodaran
 John Mackey
 Amy Cuddy
 James Hewitt
 Niklas Zennström
 Sheila Heen

Nordic Business Forum Sweden 2019 – Leadership and Marketing 
Nordic Business Forum Sweden 2019 will take place on 7 May in Stockholm.

Scheduled speakers include:

 Simon Sinek
 Ryan Holiday
 Sahar Hashemi
 Isabella Löwengrip

Nordic Business Forum Norway 2019 – Leadership and Marketing 
Nordic Business Forum Norway 2019 will take place on 9 May in Oslo.

Scheduled speakers include:

 Simon Sinek
 Sahar Hashemi
 Isabella Löwengrip
 Morten Hansen
 Avinash Kaushik
 Camilla Hessellund Lastein

Nordic Business Forum 2019 – Growth 
The tenth Nordic Business Forum will be held at the Helsinki Expo & Convention Center on 9 and 10 October.

Scheduled speakers include:

 George Clooney
 Randi Zuckerberg
 Steve Wozniak
 Brené Brown
 Daniel Pink
 Sara Blakely
 Alex Osterwalder
 Anssi Rantanen
 Donald Miller
 Juliet Funt
 Costas Markides
 Carla Harris

Nordic Business Forum 2022 – Future-Focused Leadership 
The eleventh Nordic Business Forum has held in Helsinki, Finland on 20 & 21 September.

Scheduled speakers include:
 Yuval Noah Harari
 Amy Edmondson
 Rutger Bregman
 Erin Meyer
 Joseph Stiglitz
 Jitske Kramer
 Martin Lindstrom
 Zoe Chance
 Petter Stordalen
 Duncan Wardle
 Kristel Kruustuk
 Miki Kuusi

Nordic Business Forum 2023 – Be: Change 
The twelfth Nordic Business Forum is scheduled to be held on 27 and 28 of September in Messukeskus, Helsinki where speakers include Malala Yousafzai and Tim Ferriss.

Other scheduled speakers of Nordic Business Forum 2023:
 Patrick Lencioni 
 Rebecca Henderson
 Nicolai Tangen
 Francesca Gino
 Amy Webb

References

External links
 

Business conferences
Global economic conferences